The red rock hares are the four species in the genus Pronolagus. They are African lagomorphs of the family Leporidae.

Taxonomic history
Species in this genus had previously been classified in the genus Lepus, as done by J. E. Gray, or in Oryctolagus, as done by Charles Immanuel Forsyth Major.

The genus Pronolagus was proposed by Marcus Ward Lyon, Jr. in 1904, based on a skeleton that had been labeled Lepus crassicaudatus . Lyon later acknowledged the work of Oldfield Thomas and Harold Schwann, which argued that particular specimen belonged to a species they named Pronolagus ruddi ; he wrote that the type species "should stand as Pronolagus crassicaudatus  (not ) = Pronolagus ruddi ".

P. ruddi is no longer regarded as its own species, but rather a subspecies of P. crassicaudatus.

In the 1950s, John Ellerman and Terence Morrison-Scott classified Poelagus as a subgenus of Pronolagus. B. G. Lundholm regarded P. randensis as a synonym of P. crassicaudatus. Neither of these classifications received much support.

Previously proposed species in this genus include:
 P. melanurus  (Now a synonym of P. rupestris)
 P. ruddi  (Now a synonym or subspecies of P. crassicaudatus)
 P. intermedius 
 P. whitei   (Now a synonym or subspecies of P. randensis)
 P. caucinus   (Now a synonym or subspecies of P. randensis)
 P. barretti   (Now a synonym of P. saundersiae)

Extant species
This genus contains the following species:

Description
Some characteristics of animals in this genus include: the lack of an interparietal bone in adults, a mesopterygoid space which is narrower than the minimal length of the hard palate, short ears, and the lack of a stripe along its jaw.

Fossils
A fossil skull of an animal in this genus was found in South Africa; Henry Lyster Jameson named the species Pronolagus intermedius as it was described as being intermediate between P. crassiacaudatus and P. ruddi.

Genetics

All species in this genus have 21 pairs of chromosomes (2n = 42). The karotype for P. rupestris has been published.  The Pronolagus chromosomes have undergone four fusions and one fission from the Lagomorpha ancestral state (2n=48), which resembled the karotype of Lepus.

Notes

References

Further reading
 
 
 
 

 
Taxonomy articles created by Polbot